Jaime Huélamo (17 November 1948 – 31 January 2014) was a road racing cyclist from Spain, who was a professional rider from 1973 to 1975. He was born in Cuenca, Spain. He represented his native country at the 1972 Summer Olympics in Munich, West Germany, where he finished third in the men's individual road race but was disqualified and stripped of the bronze medal after failing a drug test.

See also
 List of sportspeople sanctioned for doping offences
 List of doping cases in cycling

References

External links
 Spanish Olympic Committee
 
 Jaime Huélamo's obituary 

1948 births
2014 deaths
Spanish male cyclists
Cyclists at the 1972 Summer Olympics
Olympic cyclists of Spain
Doping cases in cycling
Spanish sportspeople in doping cases
Competitors stripped of Summer Olympics medals
People from Cuenca, Spain
Sportspeople from the Province of Cuenca
Cyclists from Castilla-La Mancha